Holton Village Halt was a railway halt on the East Lincolnshire Railway which served the village of Holton-le-Clay in Lincolnshire between 1905 and 1961. The line through Holton-le-Clay remained open for freight until December 1980.

History
The station was opened on 11 December 1905 to coincide with the introduction of a motor train service by the Great Northern Railway. It was the second station opened on the East Lincolnshire Line to serve the village of Holton-le-Clay in Lincolnshire. Holton-le-Clay and Tetney had opened in 1848 but was over a mile to the south of the village and more convenient for Tetney to the east, whilst Holton Village Halt was in the village itself. The station had two low parallel railmotor platforms to the south of a level crossing over Tetney Lane, with a timber waiting shelter and lamp on each platform. A stationhouse was situated on the north side of the crossing.

Although the July 1922 timetable shows that passenger services only called at the station upon request,  by August 1961 a total of seven trains from Grimsby called on weekdays, with an extra train running on Fridays. The station closed to passengers on 11 September 1961; it outlasted the earlier Holton-le-Clay station to the south by six years.

Present day
The halt was demolished by British Rail long before final closure of the line in December 1980 and little remains of it today. The level crossing gates to the south have survived and the stationhouse is in private occupation. The village of Holton-le-Clay has expanded over the fields which bordered the line, which has led one author to speculate that the East Lincolnshire Railway, if it had remained open, would have become a vital link between the village and Grimsby.

The Lincolnshire Wolds Railway plans to extend the line up to Holton-Le-Clay station. The former village halt has now been built over with a housing development and the track bed to the south re-developed.

References

Sources

External links
 Holton Village Halt on navigable 1946 O. S. map

Disused railway stations in Lincolnshire
Railway stations in Great Britain closed in 1961
Railway stations in Great Britain opened in 1905
Former Great Northern Railway stations